Jamaica has two traditional parties from the old colonial era, they are the Jamaica Labour Party (JLP) and the People's National Party (PNP). The United Independents' Congress of Jamaica (UIC) became the first new (post colonial) registered political party on December 7, 2019. Other parties have cropped up and disintegrated in the past due mostly to a lack of funding and effective differentiation from the major parties. Since 2018, political parties are now required to be registered by the ECJ or Electoral Commission of Jamaica. This has eliminated all the other minor parties that have not been able to meet registration requirements.

Major parties

Minor parties

Defunct parties
Agricultural Industrial Party
Christian Conscience Movement
Christian Democratic Party
Coloured Party – founded in the 1820s to campaign for full civil rights.
Communist Party of Jamaica
Convention Independent Party
Farmers' Federation
Farmers' Party
Federation of Citizen's Association
Imperial Ethiopian World Federation Incorporated Political Party
Independent Labour Party
Jamaica Alliance for National Unity
Jamaica Democratic Party
Jamaica Independent Movement
Jamaica Liberal Party
Jamaica Radical Workers Union
Jamaica Socialist Party
Jamaica United Front
Jamaica United Party – formerly the United West Indian Party
Jamaica We Party
Jerusalem Bread Foundation
National Labour Party
New Jamaica Alliance
People's Freedom Movement
People's Political Party –  Jamaica's first party, founded by Marcus Mosiah Garvey in 1929.
Progressive Labour Movement – merged with the People's Political Party  soon after being founded in 1961.
Republican Party
United Party of Jamaica
United People's Party
Workers Party of Jamaica – defunct Marxist party

See also
 Politics of Jamaica
 Elections in Jamaica

References

Jamaica
 
Political parties
Jamaica
Political parties